The 2022–23 Women's Senior T20 Trophy was the 14th edition of the Women's Senior T20 Trophy, the domestic women's T20 competition in India. The tournament took place between 11 October and 5 November 2022, with 37 teams divided into five groups. Railways won the tournament, claiming their eleventh T20 title.

Competition format
37 teams competed in the tournament, divided into two groups of eight and three groups of seven, playing each other side in their group once. The winner of each group progressed straight to the quarter-finals, whilst the second-placed team in each group and the best third-placed team progressed to the pre-quarter-finals. Matches were played using a Twenty20 format.

The groups worked on a points system with positions within the groups being based on the total points. Points were awarded as follows:

Win: 4 points. 
Tie: 2 points. 
Loss: 0 points. 
No Result/Abandoned: 2 points.

If points in the final table were equal, teams were separated by most wins, then head-to-head record, then Net Run Rate.

League stage

Points tables

Group A

Group B

Group C

Group D

Group E

 Advanced to the quarter-finals.
 Advanced to the pre-quarter-finals.

Source: BCCI

Fixtures

Group A

Group B

Group C

Group D

Group E

Knockout stages

Pre-quarter-finals

Quarter-finals

Semi-finals

Final

Statistics

Most runs

Source: BCCI

Most wickets

Source: BCCI

References

Women's Senior T20 Trophy
Women's Senior T20 Trophy
2022 in Indian cricket